Bob Stam (6 August 1918 – 16 April 1986) was a Dutch footballer. He played in four matches for the Netherlands national football team from 1939 to 1940.

References

External links
 

1918 births
1986 deaths
Dutch footballers
Netherlands international footballers
Place of birth missing
Association footballers not categorized by position